NFPA 1001 (Standard for Firefighter Professional Qualifications) is a standard published by the National Fire Protection Association.

Purpose 
NFPA 1001 identifies the minimum job performance requirements (JPRs) for career and volunteer firefighters whose duties are primarily structural in nature.

Structure 
The NFPA 1001 is sectioned as follows:
 1. Administration
 2. Referenced Publications
 3. Definitions
 4. Entrance Requirements
 5. Fire Fighter I
 6. Fire Fighter II

External links
document information

Firefighting in the United States
Safety organizations
NFPA Standards